Guillermo Vilas was the defending champion but did not compete that year.

José Luis Clerc won in the final 6–7, 2–6, 7–5, 6–0, 6–3 against Rolf Gehring.

Seeds
A champion seed is indicated in bold text while text in italics indicates the round in which that seed was eliminated.

 n/a
  José Luis Clerc (champion)
  Víctor Pecci (semifinals)
  Hans Gildemeister (quarterfinals)
  Mario Martinez (second round)
  Rolf Gehring (final)
  Andrés Gómez (quarterfinals)
  Marcos Hocevar (second round)

Draw

Final

Section 1

Section 2

External links
 1980 South American Championships Singles draw

Singles